Ambra Esposito (born 12 September 1996) is an Italian swimmer. She is the 2013 Mediterranean and 2014 Youth Olympic champion in the 200-metre backstroke.

Career 
At the 2012 European Junior Championships, Esposito won a bronze medal in the 100-metre backstroke behind Mie Nielsen and Jessica Fullalove, and she also won the bronze in the 200-metre backstroke behind Iuliia Larina and Iryna Hlavnyk. Esposito won the 200-metre backstroke event at the 2013 Mediterranean Games ahead of her teammate Margherita Panziera.

Esposito competed in three events at the 2014 Youth Olympics- 50-metre, 100-metre, and 200-metre backstroke. In the 50-metre backstroke, she placed 29th in the heats and did not qualify for the semifinals. After finishing 6th in the heats and the semifinals, she qualified to the finals of the 100-metre backstroke where she finished 8th. In the 200-metre backstroke, Esposito tied for the gold medal with Hannah Moore with a time of 2:10.42. She then competed at the 2014 FINA World Championships. In the 100-metre backstroke, she finished 51st in the heats, and in the 200-metre backstroke, she finished 35th in the heats.

References

External links 
 

1996 births
Living people
Italian female backstroke swimmers
Swimmers at the 2014 Summer Youth Olympics
Youth Olympic gold medalists for Italy
Mediterranean Games gold medalists for Italy
Mediterranean Games medalists in swimming
People from San Giorgio a Cremano
Sportspeople from the Province of Naples
21st-century Italian women